Quentin Merlin (born 16 May 2002) is a French professional footballer who plays as a forward for Ligue 1 club Nantes.

Early life 
Born in Nantes, Merlin grew up in Sainte-Marie-sur-Mer, in a family with Méricourtois origins. Football-wise, he was formed in Brittany, between the towns of Nantes and Pornic.

Club career 
In January 2021, Merlin was selected by Nantes manager Raymond Domenech several times in the professional squad. He eventually made his professional debut for Nantes on 10 February 2021, coming on as a half-time substitute for Ludovic Blas in a 4–2 Coupe de France loss to Lens.

The manager who selected Merlin for the game was not on the bench as the young player entered the field, Domenech having been tested positive for COVID-19, and eventually learning he had been fired right after the Lens game. Antoine Kombouaré succeeded him in the manager position.

On 19 March 2021, Merlin signed his first professional contract with Nantes.

International career 
Merlin is a youth international for France.

Honours
Nantes
Coupe de France: 2021–22

References

External links

2002 births
Living people
French footballers
France youth international footballers
Association football forwards
Footballers from Nantes
FC Nantes players
Ligue 1 players